Archips atrolucens is a species of moth of the family Tortricidae. It is found on Java in Indonesia.

The larvae feed on Euodia species and Melia azedarach.

References

Moths described in 1941
Archips
Moths of Indonesia